Jorge Vidal Valdez Chamorro (born 26 May 1994) is an Argentine professional footballer who plays as a midfielder for Argentine Primera División side Patronato.

Career

Club
Valdez Chamorro had youth spells with Las Lomas de Guernica and Lanús. He began his senior career with Argentine Primera División side Lanús in 2013. His professional debut came on 20 May in a goalless tie with Tigre, which was one of two games during 2012–13. In 2013–14, Valdez Chamorro scored the first two goals of his career after scoring twice in a 1–4 win over San Lorenzo on 12 April 2014. In his first four seasons with Lanús, he scored three goals in forty-two appearances in all competitions. In February 2016, Valdez Chamorro joined Primera División team Gimnasia y Esgrima on loan.

He remained with Gimnasia y Esgrima for two campaigns but made just four appearances. Valdez Chamorro returned to Lanús in June 2017, prior to joining Nueva Chicago of Primera B Nacional on loan on 6 January 2018. He made his debut for Nueva Chicago on 3 February during a win against Deportivo Riestra.

International
Oscar Garré selected Valdez Chamorro for his 2011 FIFA U-17 World Cup squad, he subsequently made his debut for the Argentina U17s on 21 June 2011 in a victory versus Jamaica.

Career statistics
.

References

External links

1994 births
Living people
Argentine footballers
Argentine expatriate footballers
People from San Vicente Partido
Argentina youth international footballers
Association football midfielders
Argentine Primera División players
Primera Nacional players
Club Atlético Lanús footballers
Club de Gimnasia y Esgrima La Plata footballers
Nueva Chicago footballers
Club Atlético Atlanta footballers
Club Guaraní players
Club Atlético Patronato footballers
Argentine expatriate sportspeople in Paraguay
Expatriate footballers in Paraguay
Sportspeople from Buenos Aires Province
Argentine sportspeople of Paraguayan descent